The Mattjisch Horn is a mountain of the Plessur Alps, overlooking Langwies in the Swiss canton of Graubünden. It lies on the range between the valleys of Prättigau and Schanfigg.

References

External links
 
 Mattjisch Horn on Hikr
 Mattjisch Horn on Summitpost

Mountains of the Alps
Mountains of Switzerland
Mountains of Graubünden
Two-thousanders of Switzerland
Arosa